Tomislav Domazet-Lošo (Split, 1974) is a Croatian geneticist. His fields of interest are evolutionary genetics, evolutionary developmental biology, macroevolution, and tumor evolution. He is currently employed at the Ruđer Bošković Institute as a researcher.

Education
Tomislav Domazet-Lošo, son of Croatian Admiral Davor Domazet-Lošo, was born in Split in 1974. In 1997, he graduated with a degree in biology from the Faculty of Science in Zagreb, after which he received his Ph.D. degree in genetics at the University of Cologne, Institute for Genetics in 2003.

Research
In 2007, he claimed to have developed a method of genomic philostratigraphy which states that every living organism in its genome carries a record of its evolutionary path. Hence, it is possible to read the evolutionary history of the species. In his lecture on September 17, 2007, in the Hall of the Matthias of Croatia, Domazet-Lošo presented the first ever philostratigraphic maps. Before this discovery, the only direct approach to the research of evolutionary history was to study and compare the fossil remains discovered at sites all over the world. Since it is impossible to predict where certain fossils are to be found, evolutionary research is largely dependent on good fortune in the discovery of high quality paleontological finds. The theory of genomic philostratigraphy solved this problem.

Domazet-Lošo and his associates have shown that parts of the organisms that are more exposed to the environment have a higher chance to be affected by environmental evolutionary changes. Furthermore, they  managed to show the sequence of so-called embryonic 'leaflets' that are produced in the newly conceived organism in the first days of development which is the cause of  further development of all other tissues.  Finally, they discovered a possible genetic cause of the so-called Cambrian explosion, an event that intrigued even Charles Darwin, when almost 540 million years ago in a geologically brief period, nearly all existing animal forms suddenly appeared in the fossil record. The method, on the other hand, cannot see relatively tiny events like the separation of man and chimpanzee. The widely known scientific work of Dr. Tomislav Domazet-Loš and his associates was premiered in Split at the 5th World Conference on Forensic Genetics and Molecular Anthropology.

Domazet's work is a powerful proof of the theory of evolution, although it is assumed that the evolutionary history of the species in 200 years has been mirrored in animal embryonic development, but has not been scientifically confirmed so far. Novelty is in the discovery of statistics-based genomic phylostratigraphy, which is based on statistics and which can measure the overall evolutionary age of active genes during each stage of embryonic development. The genomic phylostratiphraphic method is excellent for the reconstruction of the distant evolutionary past, for example, fifty million or one billion years old, which could only be studied solely with the help of fossils. The loin method was experimentally demonstrated three years ago and the research was done on a zebra fish. With the help of genomic phylostratigraphy, it has been shown that approximately in the middle of embryonic development there was a period when all vertebrae were morphologically similar. At this stage, which is called filetypes, differences in the appearance of fish, reptiles, and mammals are almost insignificant.

Genome phylostratigraphy opens up new chapters on research of hard-to-resolve problems in biology and medicine, and it could be particularly important to comprehend the research of tumor genetics. Domazet-Lošo and his team, for the first time, have shown in research on hydras that even simple organisms may have tumors, and it follows that the possibility of tumor development is actually an immanent feature of multicellular organisms.

References

Croatian biologists
Scientists from Split, Croatia
1974 births
Living people
Croatian anti-vaccination activists
University of Cologne alumni